Aminah Zawedde, is a Ugandan computer scientist. academic and public administrator, who serves as the permanent secretary of the Uganda Ministry of ICT and National Guidance since 15 July 2021. Before that Zawedde was a 
lecturer and researcher in the School of Computing and Informatics Technology at Makerere University, the oldest and largest public university in Uganda.

Background and education
She was born in the Buganda Region of Uganda in the 1970s. After attending local primary and secondary schools, she was admitted to Makerere University. She graduated with a Bachelor of Science in Statistics and Economics in 2001. She followed that with a Master of Science degree in Information Systems, also from Makerere University.

She also studied at the University of Cape Town, graduating with a Postgraduate Diploma in Educational Technology, in 2014. Her third degree was a Doctor of Philosophy in Software Engineering, obtained from the Eindhoven University of Technology, in the Netherlands, in 2016.

Career
Zawedde has been a lecturer and a researcher at the School of Computing at Informatics at Makerere for over 15 years. For the first five years, she was an assistant lecturer. Starting January 2011, until July 2021 she was a tenured lecturer, who supervised undergraduate and postgraduate students at the school.

During that period, she worked and volunteered in various academic and non-academic positions, including as a Data Officer at the Electoral Commission of Uganda, as an IT Intern at the Uganda Revenue Authority, as an IT Consultant at the Infectious Diseases Institute and as visiting lecturer at KCA University in Nairobi, Kenya.

On 15 July 2021, president Yoweri Museveni made wide-reaching changes affecting a number of cabinet ministries, including the retirement of seven permanent secretaries. As part of those changes, Zawedde was appointed PS of the ICT ministry, replacing Vincent Waiswa Bagiire who was relocated to the Ministry of Foreign Affairs.

Other considerations
Zawedde has authored or co-written a number of peer-reviewed articles, in the areas of her expertise and has presented some of them at international, regional and national conferences.

She serves as a non-executive director of DFCU Group, the parent company of DFCU Bank and of National Information Technology Authority Uganda (NITA-U).

See also
 Geraldine Ssali Busuulwa
 List of government ministries of Uganda

References

External links
Dr. Aminah Zawedde: Member NITA Uganda
Breaking: Museveni names new Permanent Secretaries As of 15 July 2021.

Living people
Ganda people
1978 births
Ugandan Muslims
Makerere University alumni
University of Cape Town alumni
Eindhoven University of Technology alumni
Academic staff of Makerere University
People from Central Region, Uganda
21st-century Ugandan women scientists
21st-century Ugandan scientists